Bear Island may refer to:

Canada
 Bear Island (New Brunswick), New Brunswick
 Bear Island, Newfoundland and Labrador, or Deer Island, an abandoned community in Newfoundland and Labrador, Canada
 Bear Island, Smith's Cove, Nova Scotia
 Bear Island (Lake Temagami), Ontario

Nunavut
 Bear Island (Nunavut), Labrador Sea, Nunavut
 Bear Islands, Hudson Bay, Nunavut

Denmark
 Bjorne Island
 Bjorne Islands
 Nanortalik Island (Kalaallisut: "Polar Bear Place"), sometimes translated as Bear Island,  a town on Nanortalik Island, southern

Norway
 Bear Island (Norway) or Bjørnøya, an arctic island of Norway
 Bjørnøya, Ålesund, an island in Møre og Romsdal county, Norway

United States
Bear Island (Connecticut), one of the Thimble Islands, Connecticut
Bear Island (Maine), in Northeast Harbor, Maine
Bear Island (Maryland), between the Potomac River and C&O Canal near Great Falls, Montgomery County, Maryland
Bear Island (Minnesota), an island in Bear Island Lake, south of Ely, Minnesota
Bear Island (Lake Winnipesaukee), New Hampshire
Bear Island (New York), an island in the Hudson River, also known as Beeren Island, New York
Bear Island (North Carolina), an island that makes up most of Hammocks Beach State Park, North Carolina
Bear Island (South Carolina), one of the Sea Islands in Charleston County, South Carolina, South Carolina
Bear Island (Wisconsin), one of the Apostle Islands in Lake Superior, Wisconsin

Massachusetts
Bear Island (Norfolk County, Massachusetts)
Bear Island (Plymouth County, Massachusetts)

Russia
 Medvezhy Island or Bear Island, in the Sea of Okhotsk
 Medvezhyi Islands or Bear Islands, in the East Siberian Sea

Other places
 Bear Island (Antarctica)
 Bear Island (Amur River), China and Russia
 Bears Island (Tasmania), Australia
 Bere Island (or Bear Island), an island in Cork County, Ireland

Other 
Bear Island (novel), a novel by Alistair MacLean
Bear Island (film), adapted from the novel by Alistair MacLean

See also
 Bair Island
 Bear (disambiguation)